= Wade-Walker Park =

Park in Georgia, United States

Coordinates: 33.7831°N 84.1652°W

Wade-Walker Park is a 177-acre (0.277 sq mi; 72 ha) park with sports fields, hiking and biking trails, pavilions, and a fishing pier near Stone Mountain, Georgia, United States. In 2005, the park underwent a $2.5 million upgrade. The park is located at 5585 Rockbridge Road, at the intersection of Rockbridge with Stone Mountain Lithonia Road.

== Athletics ==
Wade-Walker Park is home to many sports and activities for the youth of the Stone Mountain and surrounding areas such as football, soccer, and cheer-leading.
